is one of the 104 quarters in the Eimsbüttel borough of Hamburg, Germany. In 2020 the population was 57,593.

History
On March 1, 2008 the Eimsbüttel quarter lost a part of its area to form the quarter Sternschanze in the borough Altona.

Geography
In 2006 according to the statistical office of Hamburg and Schleswig-Holstein, the quarter Eimsbüttel has an area of 3,2 km².

Politics
These are the results of Eimsbüttel in the Hamburg state election:

Demographics
In 2006, there were 54,702 people living in Eimsbüttel.

In 1999, there were 36,479 households, out of which 12.3% had children under the age of 18 living with them and 60.5% of all households were made up of individuals. The average household size was 1.59.

Education
There were 8 elementary schools and 3 secondary schools in the quarter Eimsbüttel.

Infrastructure

Health systems
There were 52 day-care centers for children, 202 physicians in private practice and 16 pharmacies.

Transportation
The quarter is serviced by the rapid transit system of the underground railway.

According to the Department of Motor Vehicles (Kraftfahrt-Bundesamt), in the quarter Eimsbüttel 16,871 private cars were registered (311 cars/1000 people). There were 244 traffic accidents total, including 205 traffic accidents with damage to persons.

Notes

References

 Statistical office Hamburg and Schleswig-Holstein Statistisches Amt für Hamburg und Schleswig-Holstein, official website

External links

Quarters of Hamburg
Eimsbüttel